Artemesia may refer to:

 Artemisia I of Caria, a female general of the Persian King Xerxes
 Artemesia (crustacean), a genus of prawns in the family Penaeidae
 Artemesia Geyser, Yellowstone National Park, United States
 Lake Artemesia, a man-made lake in Prince George's County, Maryland, United States
 Artemesia, a township in the Canadian municipality of Grey Highlands, Ontario, Canada

See also
 Artemisia (disambiguation)
 Artemisa (disambiguation)
 Artemia
 Artemis (disambiguation)